ED73 may refer to:

 JNR Class ED73, a Japanese electric locomotive type
 PKP class ED73, a Polish electric multiple unit train type